Pontecorvo (or Ponte Corvo) is a town in Italy.

Pontecorvo or Ponte Corvo may also refer to :

Bridges
 Ponte Corvo (bridge) ("raven bridge"), an Ancient Roman bridge in Padua, northern Italy

Places
 Duchy of Pontecorvo, one of the Papal States and a papal governorship
 Principality of Pontecorvo (1806–1815), created by Napoleon I Bonaparte

People with the surname
Bruno Pontecorvo (1913–1993), Italian physicist
Eugene Pontecorvo, fictional character on the HBO series, The Sopranos
Gillo Pontecorvo (1919–2006), Italian filmmaker
Guido Pontecorvo (1907–1999), Italian geneticist

See also 
 Ponte (disambiguation)
 Ponti (disambiguation)
 Pont (disambiguation)

Italian-language surnames